Family Time is a 2023 Finnish-Swedish comedy drama film written and directed by Tia Kouvo in her debut film. Starring Ria Kataja, Elina Knihtilä and Filipa Areosa, the comedy-drama follows an annual family Christmas get-together that sees the usual tensions rise. It's based on Kouvo's s 2018 short of the same name.

It is selected in Encounter at the 73rd Berlin International Film Festival, where it had its world premiere on 20 February 2023. Tia Kouvo, the first feature director is also nominated for GWFF Best First Feature Award in the festival.

Cast
 Ria Kataja as Susanna
 Elina Knihtilä as Helena
 Leena Uotila as Ella
 Tom Wentzel as Lasse
 Jarkko Pajunen as Risto
 Sakari Topi as Simo
 Elli Paajanen as Hilla
 Toomas Talikka as Kassu

Production 
It was reported on 15 September 2021, that Aamu Film Company is going to produce the film, which is going in production in February and March 2022.
Produced by Jussi Rantamäki and Emilia Haukka, the cast includes Leena Uotila, Elina Knihtilä and Ria Kataja. Aamu Film is producing the film in co-production with Sweden-based Vilda Bomben Film and Film i Väst. Tom Wentzel, Jarkko Pajunen, Elli Paajanen and Toomas Talikka were selected as supporting cast.

Release

Family Time had its premiere on 20 February 2023, as part of the 73rd Berlin International Film Festival, in Encounter. Aurora Studios is incharge of Finland distribution whereas The Match Factory is handling world sales for the film.

Reception

Davide Abbatescianni reviewing for Cineuropa criticised the film and wrote, "This would have worked way better within a different format – that of a sitcom, for example, where a more finely tuned narrative dished out in small quantities and a shorter running time could have made the whole viewing experience smoother and more pleasant."

Accolades

References

External links
 
 
 Family Time at Berlinale

2023 films
2023 comedy-drama films
2020s Swedish films
Swedish comedy-drama films
Finnish comedy-drama films
2020s Finnish-language films
2023 directorial debut films